Attigliano is a comune (municipality) in the Province of Terni in the Italian region Umbria, located about 70 km south of Perugia and about 30 km west of Terni. Attigliano has the lowest elevation of any municipality located in Umbria.

Attigliano borders the following municipalities: Amelia, Bassano in Teverina, Bomarzo, Giove, Graffignano, Lugnano in Teverina.

References

External links
Official website  

Cities and towns in Umbria
Articles which contain graphical timelines